Přívrat is a municipality and village in Ústí nad Orlicí District in the Pardubice Region of the Czech Republic. It has about 400 inhabitants.

Notable people
Antonín Bennewitz (1833–1926), violinist and conductor

References

Villages in Ústí nad Orlicí District